Euramo is a rural locality in the Cassowary Coast Region, Queensland, Australia.

Riversdale is a neighbourhood in the west of the locality.

Geography 

Euramo is bounded to the north by the Tully River and to the south by the Murray River.

The Bruce Highway traverses the eastern part of the locality, entering the locality from the south-east (Murrigal) and exiting to the north-east (Silky Oak). The North Coast railway line also traverses the locality immediately to the west of the highway with the locality being served by Euramo railway station.

Djilgarin Conservation Park is an  protected area in centre of the locality. Apart from that, the land use is predominantly growing sugarcane.

History

Euramo State School opened on 19 September 1927. In 1930, a "new" school building was relocated from the closed Japoon West State School in Japoonvale to a site in Euramo donated by Mr J.A. Winter. It closed in 1974. The school was on the Bruce Highway (approx ).

Riversdale State School opened on 11 May 1953. It closed on 23 August 1968. It was at approx 917 Davidson Road on a site donated by Mrs Bryce Henry.

Education 
There are no schools in Euramo. The nearest government primary schools are Tully State School in Tully to the north and Murray River Upper State School in Murray Upper in the south-west. The nearest government secondary school is Tully State High School in Tully to the north.

References 

Cassowary Coast Region
Localities in Queensland